Tongchang County is a kun, or county, in the northeast of the far western North Pyŏngan province, North Korea. It borders Pyŏktong and Chagang's Usi county to the north, Unsan and Songwŏn (in Chagang province) to the east, Thaechŏn to the south, and Changsŏng and Taegwan to the west.

Geography
The Pinandŏk Mountains pass through northern and eastern Tongchang, contributing the county's highest point, Tanphungdŏksan (단풍덕산, 1159 m).  The Changsŏng River flows from the northwest to the southeast, on its way to join the Taedong. Some 80% of the county's land is forested (of which 40% is coniferous, with mixed pine-oak woods predominating).

Administrative divisions
Tongchang county is divided into 1 ŭp (town), 1 rodongjagu (workers' district) and 16 ri (villages):

Climate
The year-round local temperature is 7 °C, with an average of -10 °C in January and 22.8 °C in August.  The average annual rainfall is quite high, at 1440 mm.

Industry
The dominant local industry is mining. The first gold mine there was opened in Taeyu-dong in 1896 by a French concern. In addition, silver and apatite are now mined. Tongchang has the least cultivable land of any county in the province, at 6.5% of its total area; most of that (80%) consists of dry fields unsuitable for rice. The chief local crop, therefore, is maize. There are numerous small-scale hydroelectric power stations.

See also
Geography of North Korea
Administrative divisions of North Korea
North Pyongan

References

External links

Counties of North Pyongan